ASUSat (Arizona State University Satellite, also known as ASU-OSCAR 37) was a U.S. amateur radio satellite that was developed and built for educational purposes by students at Arizona State University. It was equipped with two digital cameras for tracking changes to Earth's coasts and forests.

ASUSat was launched on January 27, 2000, along with JAWSAT with a Minotaur I rocket from Vandenberg Air Force Base, Lompoc, California. ASUSat was received 50 minutes after the start in South Africa, later also in New Zealand and the United States. During two overflights over Arizona, Arizona State University students were able to receive and control the satellite remotely. A problem with the power supply was reported on the third pass, 14 hours after take-off. The solar cells did not provide any electrical energy, so the batteries were exhausted shortly afterwards.

Frequencies
 Uplink: 145.900 MHz
 Downlink: 436.700 MHz

See also

 OSCAR

References

Satellites orbiting Earth
Amateur radio satellites
Nanosatellites
Spacecraft launched in 2000